Levan Gelbakhiani (born December 30, 1997) is a Georgian actor and dancer. He is known for his role as Merab in the drama film And Then We Danced.

Filmography

Film

Awards and nominations

References

External links
 

1997 births
Living people
Male film actors from Georgia (country)
Male dancers from Georgia (country)
Male ballet dancers from Georgia (country)
Best Actor Guldbagge Award winners